Eric Marcus (born November 12, 1958, New York City) is an American journalist, podcast producer, and non-fiction writer. He is the founder and host of the Making Gay History podcast, which brings LGBT history to life through the voices of the people who lived it, and he is co-producer of Those Who Were There: Voices from the Holocaust, a podcast drawn from the Fortunoff Video Archive for Holocaust Testimonies at Yale University. His books are primarily of LGBT interest, including Breaking the Surface, the autobiography of gay Olympic diving champion Greg Louganis, which became a #1 New York Times best seller and Making History: The Struggle for Gay and Lesbian Equal Rights, 1945–1990, which won the Stonewall Book Award. He is also the author of Why Suicide? Questions and Answers about Suicide, Suicide Prevention, and Coping with the Suicide of Someone You Know. He has written for a range of publications including The New York Times, Time, Newsweek, the New York Daily News, and the New York Post.

Background 
Marcus received his B.A. from Vassar College in 1980 where he majored in urban studies. He earned his master's degree from Columbia University Graduate School of Journalism in 1984 and a master's degree in real estate development in 2003, also from Columbia University. He was an associate producer for Good Morning America and CBS Morning News.

Between 2010 and 2014, Marcus served on the board of the American Foundation for Suicide Prevention (ASFP).

Works
The Male Couple's Guide: Finding a Man, Making a Home, Building a Life (HarperCollins, 1988, 1992, 1999)
Making History: The Struggle for Gay and Lesbian Equal Rights, 1945 to 1990 (HarperCollins, 1992)
Expect the Worst (You Won't Be Disappointed) (HarperSF, 1992)
Is It a Choice? Answers to 300 of the Most Frequently Asked Questions about Gay & Lesbian People (HarperOne, 1993, 1999, 2005)
Breaking the Surface: The Greg Louganis Story (Random House, 1995; Plume, 1996)
Icebreaker: The Autobiography of U.S. Figure Skating Champion Rudy Galindo (Pocket Books, 1997)
Together Forever: Gay & Lesbian Couples Share Their Secrets for Lasting Happiness (Anchor Books, 1998, 1999)
Making Gay History: The Half-Century Fight for Lesbian & Gay Equal Rights (HarperCollins, 2002)
Pessimisms: Famous (and Not So Famous) Observations, Quotations, Thoughts, and Ruminations on What to Expect When You’re Expecting the Worst (Anova Books, 2007)
What If? Answers to Questions about What It Means to Be Gay and Lesbian (Simon Pulse, September 2007)
Why Suicide? Questions & Answers about Suicide, Suicide Prevention, and Coping with the Suicide of Someone You Know (HarperOne, 2010)

See also
 LGBT culture in New York City
 List of LGBT people from New York City

References

External links
Making Gay History — The Podcast official site
Those Who Were There podcast official site

1958 births
American non-fiction writers
Columbia University Graduate School of Journalism alumni
American gay writers
Historians of LGBT topics
Living people
Vassar College alumni
American LGBT journalists
Stonewall Book Award winners